Andrew Nesbitt Nelson (born 5 July 1935) is a former football player and manager. As a player, he won the Football League with Ipswich Town in 1962.

He entered management with Gillingham in 1971, but quit to manage Charlton Athletic in 1974, and was an immediate success with promotion from the Third Division in 1975. 1976 and 1977 saw top ten finishes in the league, but in the following two years Charlton had rely on last day results to escape relegation, and Nelson came under pressure. In 1979, he came under increased pressure as Mike Bailey was appointed as chief coach, and by March 1980 his contract had been cancelled after three successive defeats with Charlton in the relegation zone.

Honours
Ipswich Town
 Football League First Division: 1961–62
 Football League Second Division: 1960–61

Individual
Ipswich Town Hall of Fame: Inducted 2011

References

External links 

Andy Nelson profile from the official Charlton Athletic website

1935 births
Living people
Footballers from the London Borough of Newham
Association football defenders
English footballers
West Ham United F.C. players
Ipswich Town F.C. players
Plymouth Argyle F.C. players
Leyton Orient F.C. players
English Football League players
English football managers
Charlton Athletic F.C. managers
Gillingham F.C. managers
English Football League managers